"When I Grow Up" is the second single from Swedish recording artist Fever Ray's self-titled debut album, Fever Ray (2009).

Critical reception
Pitchfork Media placed "When I Grow Up" at number 36 on the website's list of The Top 100 Tracks of 2009.

Music video
The music video for "When I Grow Up" was directed by Martin de Thurah. He said of the video's visual statement:

"That initial idea was something about something coming out of water—something which was about to take form – a state turning into something new. But the idea had to take a simpler form, to let the song grow by itself. I remembered a photo I took in Croatia two years ago, a swimming pool with its shining blue color in a grey foggy autumn landscape."

The video premiered on Fever Ray's YouTube channel on 19 February 2009. It has received over 12 million views as of March 2016.

"When I Grow Up" was placed at number three on Spins list of The 20 Best Videos of 2009.

Track listings
iTunes single
"When I Grow Up" – 4:31
"When I Grow Up" (Håkan Lidbo's Encephalitis Remix) – 5:59
"When I Grow Up" (D. Lissvik) – 4:28
"Memories from When I Grew Up (Remembered by The Subliminal Kid)" – 16:41
"When I Grow Up" (Van Rivers Dark Sails on the Horizon Mix) – 9:16
"When I Grow Up" (We Grow Apart Vocal Version by Pär Grindvik) – 6:02
"When I Grow Up" (We Grow Apart Inspiration - Take 2 - By Pär Grindvik) – 7:59
"When I Grow Up" (Scuba's High Up Mix) – 6:17
"When I Grow Up" (Scuba's Straight Down Mix) – 5:54
"When I Grow Up" (Video) – 4:04

Swedish 12" single 
A1. "When I Grow Up" (Van Rivers Dark Sails on the Horizon Mix) – 9:10
A2. "When I Grow Up" (D. Lissvik) – 4:28
B1. "Memories from When I Grew Up (Remembered by The Subliminal Kid)" – 16:41

UK promo CD single 
"When I Grow Up" (Edit) – 3:42
"When I Grow Up" (D. Lissvik Radio Edit) – 3:19

Nominations

Appearances in other media
The song was used as part of the soundtrack for the video game Pro Evolution Soccer 2011.

References

2009 singles
2009 songs
Fever Ray songs
Songs written by Karin Dreijer